Penstemon franklinii, or Franklin's penstemon, is a plant species endemic to Utah, United States, known only from Cedar Valley in Iron County. It grows in grasslands and in sagebrush communities.

Penstemon franklinii is a perennial herb up to 25 cm (10 inches) tall. Leaves are up to 6.5 cm (2.6 inches) long, some toothed and some untoothed on the same individual. Flowers are blue to blue-purple with a yellow beard on the lower part of the zygomorphic corolla.

References

franklinii
Flora of Utah
Flora without expected TNC conservation status